Herbert Benjamin Jackson  (September 24, 1883 – March 18, 1922) was a right-handed pitcher in Major League Baseball who played for the Detroit Tigers in 1905.

External links

Detroit Tigers players
Major League Baseball pitchers
1883 births
1922 deaths
Providence Grays (minor league) players
Akron Rubbernecks players
New Castle Outlaws players
Steubenville Stubs players
Wilmington Peaches players
Reading Pretzels players
Shamokin (minor league baseball) players